Nadia Petrova and Katarina Srebotnik were the defending champions but Petrova chose not to participate. Srebotnik partnered up with Květa Peschke, but they lost in the quarterfinals to Tímea Babos and Lucie Šafářová.
Babos and Šafářová went on to win the title, defeating Sara Errani and Roberta Vinci in the final, 7-5, 3-6, [10-7].

Seeds

Draw

Draw

References
 Draw

W